Rip is a village and deh in Talher taluka of Badin District, Sindh. As of 2017, it has a population of 3,219, in 678 households. It is part of the tapedar circle of Morjher.

References 

Populated places in Badin District